The 1922 Tennessee Docs football team (variously "Docs", "UT Doctors" or the "Tennessee Medicos") represented the University of Tennessee College of Medicine in Memphis in the 1922 college football season. The game against Washington University scheduled for Armistice Day was canceled due to a lack of eligible players.

Schedule

References

Tennessee Docs
Tennessee Docs football seasons
College football undefeated seasons
Tennessee Docs football